Solar power in Wyoming has the potential to generate 72 million MWh/yr. Wyoming used 12 million MWh in 1999. Wyoming is one of the country's windiest states and has the potential to generate 883 million MWh/yr from wind power. Solar and wind power tend to complement each other, with more solar power available in summer and during the day, and more wind power available at night and during the winter. Net metering is available to all consumers generating up to 25 kW. IREC best practices, based on experience, recommends no limits to net metering, individual or aggregate, and perpetual roll over of kWh credits. Installing a 5 kW solar array could cost $20,000 but is expected to pay for itself in 15 years, and go on to return a $15,166 profit over its expected 25 year life.

Facilities 

The dormitories near Old Faithful Geyser installed 30.78 kW of solar panels in 2015.

The 92MW Sweetwater Solar project near Green River came online as the first utility-scale solar farm in Wyoming in December 2018. Additional projects are in advanced stages of development to be located near Kemmerer as the region's economy transitions from a scheduled closure of the Naugton coal plant.

Statistics

See also

Wind power in Wyoming
Solar power in the United States
Renewable energy in the United States

References

External links
 The Open PV Project
 Incentives and Policies

Energy in Wyoming
Wyoming